Kostelec u Holešova is a municipality and village in Kroměříž District in the Zlín Region of the Czech Republic. It has about 1,000 inhabitants.

Administrative parts
The village of Karlovice is an administrative part of Kostelec u Holešova.

References

Villages in Kroměříž District